is a 1990 vertical-scrolling shooter arcade game developed and published by Namco. It is a sequel to Dragon Spirit, released in 1987.

Gameplay

As in the original Dragon Spirit, players must take control of a prince transformed into a dragon by a flash of lightning: the first controls "Huey" (blue) and the second player controls "Siria" (red), which means that two players can now play simultaneously; Huey also looks like an 8192-colour version of Prince Amul from the original game, and both players can now press and hold their Firing Buttons to make their dragons spit flames continuously (and, if they wait for a few seconds without pressing them, charge their shots). Several new enemies and powerups have also been introduced - and, much like in Phelios, Huey and Siria can take up to four hits before dying (depending on what the arcade operators set the "LIFE" option to), which means that if they have set it to "1" they will die immediately when they get hit.

Development
Dragon Saber was the creation of Namco artist Yoshihiro Sugiyama, being his first time as a planner for a game. Sugiyama wanted the game to feel like a true continuation of its predecessor Dragon Spirit in terms of its storyline and world, as he felt the NES sequel Dragon Spirit: The New Legend was mostly just a rehash of the original and had a rather generic premise. He also wanted the game to appeal to anyone instead of mostly hardcore shooter enthusiasts, and one that many could find a degree of satisfaction in. Once the story was completed, Sugiyama began work on the game's lore and fictional world, wanting it to be one that players hadn't seen before in similar games beforehand.

Ports
There were three ports of this arcade game in Japan; the first was for the PC Engine in 1991, which was exclusive to Japan. The second was a part of the Namco Museum Encore compilation for the Sony PlayStation that was released in 1997 (however, unlike the previous Namco Museum titles, this one never got released outside Japan), and the third was the Virtual Console Arcade release in 2008 (of the PC Engine version) and 2009 (of the original arcade version), which was also exclusive to Japan. Dragon Saber would also be released on the PlayStation 4 and Nintendo Switch via the Arcade Archives series on July 14th, 2022, marking its first official release in the west.

Reception
Game Machine listed Dragon Saber as being the most popular arcade game of December 1990 in Japan.

Notes

References

External links

1990 video games
Arcade video games
TurboGrafx-16 games
Virtual Console games
PlayStation 4 games
Namco games
Namco arcade games
Nintendo Switch games
Video games about dragons
Vertically scrolling shooters
Video games about shapeshifting
Video games developed in Japan
Video games scored by Shinji Hosoe
Cooperative video games
Vertically-oriented video games
Hamster Corporation games